The Woman Next Door is a 1919 American silent drama film directed by Robert G. Vignola and written by Carolyn Wells. The film stars Ethel Clayton, Emory Johnson, Noah Beery, Sr., Jane Wolfe, Katherine Griffith, and Genevieve Blinn. The film was released on May 18, 1919, by Paramount Pictures.

Plot
A man mistakes another man's wife as that man's daughter and starts a love affair with her.

Cast
{| 
! style="width: 180px; text-align: left;" |  Actor
! style="width: 230px; text-align: left;" |  Role
|- style="text-align: left;"
|Frank Whitson||August
|-
|Ethel Clayton||Mrs. Randolph Schuyler / Vicky Van
|-
|Emory Johnson||Chester Calhoun
|-
|Noah Beery, Sr.||Randolph Schuyler
|-
|Jane Wolfe||Tibbetts / 'Julie'
|-
|Katherine Griffith||Rhoda Schuyler
|-
|Genevieve Blinn||Helen Schuyler
|-
|Josephine Crowell||Aunt Eleanor Endicott
|-
|Clarence Geldart||Detective Fleming Stone|Mae Hughes
|-
|}

Production
The working titles for the film were The Girl Next Door and Vicky.

Preservation status
No prints exist of this film.

References

External links
 
 lobby card promotion listed by the character Clayton plays in the film(archived)

1919 films
1910s English-language films
Silent American drama films
1919 drama films
Paramount Pictures films
Films directed by Robert G. Vignola
American black-and-white films
American silent feature films
1910s American films